James-Edward Manfred Léa Siliki (born 12 June 1996) is a professional footballer who plays as a midfielder for Primeira Liga club Estoril. Born in France, he represents Cameroon at international level.

Club career
Léa Siliki made his Ligue 1 debut with Rennes on 28 January 2017 against Nantes, replacing Aldo Kalulu after 78 minutes.

On 31 August 2021, Léa Siliki joined EFL Championship club Middlesbrough on loan for the duration of the 2021–22 season. Having not played a single minute since the manager who had brought Léa Siliki to Teesside, Neil Warnock, had been replaced by Chris Wilder, the midfielder was told by Wilder that he could leave the club during the January transfer window. His return to action came in February 2022, being replaced at half-time during a 3–2 defeat to struggling Barnsley.

On 22 July 2022, Léa Siliki signed for Primeira Liga club Estoril on a three-year contract.

International career
Léa Siliki is of Cameroonian descent. He represented the France U19 in 2014. He debuted with the senior Cameroon national team in a 1–0 friendly win over Nigeria on 4 June 2021.

Personal life
In March 2022, Léa Siliki was subjected to racist abuse on Instagram after posting a celebration of Cameroon's qualification for the 2022 FIFA World Cup.

Career statistics

Honours
Rennes
Coupe de France: 2018–19
Cameroon

 Africa Cup of Nations bronze: 2021

References

External links

1996 births
Living people
People from Sarcelles
Citizens of Cameroon through descent
Cameroonian footballers
Cameroon international footballers
French footballers
France youth international footballers
French sportspeople of Cameroonian descent
Association football forwards
Stade Rennais F.C. players
Middlesbrough F.C. players
G.D. Estoril Praia players
Ligue 1 players
Championnat National 2 players
Championnat National 3 players
English Football League players

2021 Africa Cup of Nations players
Cameroonian expatriate footballers
French expatriate footballers
Expatriate footballers in England
Cameroonian expatriate sportspeople in England
French expatriate sportspeople in England
Expatriate footballers in Portugal
French expatriate sportspeople in Portugal
Cameroonian expatriate sportspeople in Portugal
Footballers from Val-d'Oise